Niu Zhuang (born 26 June 1994) is a Chinese former professional snooker player.

Career
Niu first received attention in world snooker when he entered APTC Event 2 in 2012, reaching the last 16 and defeating established professionals Mark King (4–0) and future World Champion Stuart Bingham (4–3). He reached the same stage at the 2015 Xuzhou Open where he was defeated by Alfie Burden. His most notable result was defeating Matthew Selt 4–1 in the last 64.

He achieved a two-year world snooker tour card in May 2017 due to his performances on the Chinese professional tour.

Performance and rankings timeline

Notes

References

External links

Niu Zhuang at worldsnooker.com
Niu Zhuang at CueTracker.net: Snooker Results and Statistic Database
Profile on Snooker.org

1994 births
People from Fuyang
Living people
Chinese snooker players
21st-century Chinese people